
Gmina Oporów is a rural gmina (administrative district) in Kutno County, Łódź Voivodeship, in central Poland.

Villages
Gmina Oporów contains the villages and settlements of Golędzkie, Janów, Jastrzębia, Jaworzyna, Jurków Drugi, Jurków Pierwszy, Kamienna, Kurów-Parcel, Kurów-Wieś, Mnich, Mnich-Ośrodek, Mnich-Południe, Oporów, Oporów-Kolonia, Pobórz, Podgajew, Samogoszcz, Skarżyn, Skórzewa, Stanisławów, Świechów, Szczyt, Wola Owsiana, Wola Prosperowa and Wólka-Lizigódź.

Neighbouring gminas
Gmina Oporów is bordered by the gminas of Bedlno, Krzyżanów, Kutno, Pacyna, Strzelce, Szczawin Kościelny and Żychlin.

References
Polish official population figures 2006

Oporow
Kutno County